The Review of Philosophy and Psychology is a peer-reviewed academic journal published by Springer that focuses on philosophical and foundational issues in cognitive science. The journal is hosted at the Jean Nicod Institute (Paris), a research center of the French National Centre for Scientific Research (CNRS).

History 
The journal started publication in 1994 as European Review of Philosophy. Under its former name, it was published by Stanford University's CSLI Publications and distributed by the University of Chicago Press. It was renamed to its current title in 2010 and volume numbering was started at 1 again.

Notable articles
 "Red, Bitter, Good" (1996) - Peter Railton
 "The Dynamics of Situations" (1997) - François Recanati
 "Rip Van Winkle and Other Characters" (1997) - John Perry
 "The Essence of Response-Dependence" (1998) - Ralph Wedgewood

See also 
 List of philosophy journals
 List of psychology journals

References

External links 
  
 European Review of Philosophy at CSLI publications

Cognitive science journals
Philosophy of mind journals
Springer Science+Business Media academic journals
Publications established in 1994
Publications established in 2010